Via Drine, sometimes also Dubrovački put, was a medieval trade route through the Dinaric Alps that connected Dubrovnik (Republic of Ragusa) with the Drina river valley, and from there to various places in medieval Serbia and the rest of the Balkans.

The route went through Trebinje, Bileća, Gacko, Foča, Goražde, Višegrad, and Srebrenica. From Trebinje, a route forked towards the Via de Zenta. From Foča, a route forked towards the Via Militaris in Niš. From Srebrenica, a route went to Sremska Mitrovica.

It was one of the two main routes from Bosnia to Dubrovnik, and was also known as the dubrovački put (lit. the path to Dubrovnik); the other was Via Narenta that followed the path of the Neretva.

References

Sources
 
 
 

Trade routes
Economy of the Republic of Ragusa
Medieval Bosnia and Herzegovina
Economic history of Bosnia and Herzegovina
Medieval roads and tracks